Mouretia tonkinensis is a species of plant in the family Rubiaceae. It is endemic to Vietnam.

Green in color and slippery to the touch, it was nicknamed les feuilles verts by French settlers to Indo-China. American soldiers serving in the Vietnam War knew it by the less flattering title of "itchygrass".

References
Sources
 
Notes

Tonkinensis
Vulnerable plants
Endemic flora of Vietnam
Taxonomy articles created by Polbot